Science is a systematic method for obtaining knowledge through testable explanations and predictions.

Science may also refer to:

Branches
 Natural science, the use of the scientific method to study the universe
 Social science, the use of the scientific method to study society
 Formal science, the study of rules, logic, and formal systems of information
 Applied science, the study of technology
 Mathematical science, the study of mathematical nature

Literature

 Science (journal), the academic journal of the American Association for the Advancement of Science
 Science (1979–1986 magazine), a general science magazine published by the AAAS as Science 80, merged into Discover
 The Sciences, a popular science magazine published by the New York Academy of Sciences from 1961 to 2001

Music
 S.C.I.E.N.C.E., a 1997 album by Incubus
 Science (album), a 2006 album by Thomas Dybdahl
 "Science", a song by System of a Down from Toxicity

Other uses
 Chico Science (1966–1997), a Brazilian singer and composer
 Kieron "Science" Harvey, a housemate in British Big Brother series 6
 Science (film), a 2010 stand-up show and film by Ricky Gervais
 Science (sculpture), a 1925 work by Charles Keck
 Science (UIL test), an academic competition in Texas, US
 Science Channel, a television channel owned by Discovery Networks
 Science Ltd, a company founded and owned by artist Damien Hirst
Science Inc., a Los Angeles-based startup studio that develops, invests in, and acquires businesses

See also
 Index of branches of science
 Big Science (disambiguation)